Deir Hanna is a local council in the Northern District of Israel, located on the hills of the Lower Galilee,  southeast of Acre. Approximately 90% of Deir Hanna's inhabitants are Arab-Muslims and the remaining 10% are Arab-Christians.

Etymology
Several etymologies had been presented including: 
The Convent of St. John
 In the name of a Christian saint
 Yohana or Hanun village which existed up until 732 BC and then again under the Byzantine rule
 In name of a crusader who conquered the area
 In the name of Saint Mary

History

Crusaders
In the  Crusader era, Deir Hanna was  a fief  known as  Berhenne, or Der Henne. In 1174 it was one of the casalia (villages)  given to  Phillipe le Rous.  In 1236  descendants  of Phillipe le Rous confirmed the sale of the fief of Deir Henna. According to  architectural researcher Andrew Petersen, no traces of Crusader occupation were found in the village.

Ottoman Empire

Deir Hanna became a base for the Zaydānī family in the 18th century, and thus its importance grew with Zahir al-Umar's rise to power during that time. In the early to mid-18th century, Zahir gave his elder brother, Sa'd el-Omar, control of the village and nearby Arraba. The two villages served as the rural stronghold of the Zaydani family, and before taking the port town of Acre, Zahir resided in Deir Hanna and used it as his principal base of operations. Sa'd commissioned the construction of most of Deir Hanna's fortifications and in 1732-33, he built its mosque. When Sa'd died in 1767, Zahir's son Ali requested control over the village, but Zahir refused, earning him Ali's resentment.

Following Zahir's defeat and death at the hands of the Ottoman military in 1775, Ali al-Zahir took over Deir Hanna. The Ottoman governor Jezzar Pasha launched a military campaign against Zahir's sons and besieged Deir Hanna. The strength of the village fortress allowed Ali to withstand the siege for several months until Jezzar received reinforcements from the Kapudan Hasan Pasha in July 1776. With the siege intensifying, Ali managed to escape the village and seek safety in Mount Lebanon, settling in the village of Niha. On 22 July, heavy damage to the fort by Ottoman cannon fire forced the remaining defenders to surrender. The surviving defenders of Deir Hanna were expelled from the village with their families by Jezzar, who subsequently demolished large parts of the village's fortress.

Sa'd el-Omar is credited with the construction of the village fort's high inner walls, which at the time had 12 towers. Zahir is credited with the construction of the outer walls, while Ali al-Zahir had two towers built off of the eastern and western sides of the fort. Both of the latter towers were separated from the fortress and were meant to serve as additional protection in the event of a siege. The Zaydani mosque of Deir Hanna, before its destruction in 1776, had been the "most famous of all the Zaydani's buildings in the Galilee", according to historian Moshe Sharon. Local tradition claims that the mosque was built on top of an older Crusader-era church and that Jezzar Pasha had been so impressed by Sa'd's mosque, that he copied its design for his namesake mosque in Acre.

Local peasants re-inhabited Deir Hanna sometime after Jezzar's assault, but the village did not recover its prominence and no longer posed a threat to Ottoman authority.

In 1838, Deir Hanna was noted as a  Christian and Muslim village in the Esh-Shagur district, located between Safad, Acca and Tiberias. In 1875 Victor Guérin found 40 Muslim and four Greek Orthodox Christian families living in Deir Hanna. In 1881, the PEF's Survey of Western Palestine (SWP) described the village and the building works of the Zahir al-Umar era as: "High walls all around the village, which is built of stone. The walls have round towers ..." It is situated on the top of a high ridge, and contains about 400 Christians. It is surrounded by olive-groves and arable land. Water is obtained from cisterns and an old paved birkeh [pool] to the north of the village."

A population list from about 1887 showed that  Deir Hanna  had about 365 inhabitants;  280  Muslims and 85 Catholic Christians.

British Mandate

In the 1922 census of Palestine conducted by the British Mandate authorities, Dair Hanna had a population of 429; 320 Muslims and 109 Christians, where all the Christians were Orthodox.  By the 1931 census the population had increased to 563; 427 Muslims and 136 Christians, in a total of 117 houses.

In  the  1945 statistics, it had 750 Arab inhabitants; 540 Muslims and 210 Christians, with a total of 15,350 dunams of land. Of this, 2,799 dunams were plantations and irrigable land, 5,242 used for cereals, while 38 dunams were built-up land.

Israel
During Operation Hiram, 29–31 October 1948, the town surrendered to the advancing Israeli army. Many of the inhabitants fled north but some stayed and were not expelled by the Israeli soldiers. Deir Hanna remained under Martial Law until 1966.

Deir Hanna forms the Land Day triangle with Sakhnin and Arraba. The town has been through a thorough modernization process in the last 10 years, and now has a full education system, health care facilities and sports playgrounds.

Landmarks
Deir Hanna has a castle from the Zahir al-Umar era. Parts of the castle are still standing, as are the town walls, the old village church and a mosque, and it is considered a tourist attraction.

Notable people

 Hiam Abbass, actress

See also
 Arab localities in Israel
 Land Day
 Lavra Netofa

References

Bibliography

  (p. 95, Cited in Petersen, 2001)

Edwards, C., Livingstone, K., and Petersen, A. D. (1993), Dayr Hanna: an Eighteenth-Century Fortified Village in Galilee, in Levant, 25, pp 63–92 (Cited in Petersen, 2001)
 

 

  
 
 
 
 

  
(p 265 in the 1959-edition, p. 136 here)

External links
 Welcome To Dayr Hanna
Survey of Western Palestine, Map 6:  IAA, Wikimedia commons 

Arab localities in Israel
Arab Christian communities in Israel
Local councils in Northern District (Israel)